The 2004 Rolex Sports Car Series season was the fifth season of the Rolex Sports Car Series run by the Grand American Road Racing Association.  The season involved three classes, Daytona Prototypes (DP), Grand Touring (GT), and Super Grand Sport (SGS).  Twelve races were run from January 31, 2004, to October 31, 2004.

Schedule

Results 
Overall winners in bold.

Championship standings

Source:

Daytona Prototypes

Drivers (Top 20)

Grand Touring

Drivers (Top 10)

Super Grand Sport

Drivers (Top 5)

References

External links
 The official website of Grand-Am
 Grand American Road Racing Association - 2004 season archive
 World Sports Racing Prototypes - Rolex Sports Car Series 2004 results

Rolex Sports Car Series
Rolex Sports Car Series